Sean William Kelley (born April 15, 1988) is an American  former soccer player. He played for American teams during his career which lasted from 2009 to 2013.

Career

College and amateur
Kelley was born in Lexington, Kentucky and attended Paul Laurence Dunbar High School before going on to play four years of college soccer at George Mason University. As a freshman, he was named the Colonial Athletic Association Rookie of the Year, to the All-CAA Second Team and the 2006 College Soccer News All-Freshman First Team, and earned NSCAA All-South Atlantic Region Third Team honors, while as a junior and senior he earned All-CAA honors for the second and third time. He started all 77 games of his collegiate career, and had a goals against average of less than 1 goal per game.

During his college years Kelley also played with the Northern Virginia Royals in the USL Premier Development League.

Professional
Kelley was spotted by Austin Aztex head coach Adrian Heath while attending an open tryout with Major League Soccer team FC Dallas in March 2010, who signed him to a one-year contract, primarily to act as backup to first-choice goalkeeper Miguel Gallardo. He made his professional debut on September 18, 2010 in a 2-1 loss to AC St. Louis. Prior to the 2011 season, new owners purchased the club and moved it to Orlando, Florida, renaming it Orlando City S.C.

Kelley was key in the Lions' 2011 USL Pro Championships title game. He entered in the second half when Miguel Gallardo received a red card for dragging down a Harrisburg City Islanders player on a breakaway. Despite surrendering a goal late in extended time, and another early in overtime, he got a chance to atone when the Lions scored on an penalty kick near the end of overtime. In penalty kicks, Kelley stopped the first two Islanders shots as he and the Lions won, 3-2, in PKs.  Kelley was voted game MVP.

Kelley started four matches in 2012 for Orlando City, including the season opener, which Gallardo had to sit out due to his red card in the Championship Game. He initially was released after the 2012 season to be replaced by Jon Kempin, a reserve loanee from Sporting Kansas City. But Kelley was re-signed by the team on April 3, 2013, following a knee injury to Gallardo.

Honors

Orlando City
USL Pro (1): 2011

References

External links
 Austin Aztex bio
 George Mason bio

1988 births
Living people
American soccer players
Association football goalkeepers
Austin Aztex FC players
George Mason Patriots men's soccer players
Northern Virginia Royals players
Orlando City SC (2010–2014) players
Soccer players from Kentucky
Sportspeople from Lexington, Kentucky
USL Championship players
USL League Two players
USSF Division 2 Professional League players